Wild Hearts Can't Be Broken is a 1991 American drama film directed by  Steve Miner. It concerns Sonora Webster Carver, a rider of diving horses. Gabrielle Anwar stars as Carver alongside Michael Schoeffling and Cliff Robertson. It is based on events in her life as told in her memoir A Girl and Five Brave Horses.

Plot
In 1932 Sonora Webster lives with her sister, Arnette, and abusive Aunt Helen during the Great Depression. After a series of troubles, which involve her accidentally letting the cows loose, punching another girl for making fun of her poor economic background, and getting suspended from school, Aunt Helen sells her treasured horse, Lightning. Helen then tells Sonora that she will be sent to an orphanage the following day. Instead, Sonora slips out of the house during the night. She ends up at a county fair and sees a performance by Marie, a diving girl who rides a horse off a platform, and aspires to do so too. Marie's employer, Doc Carver, tells her she is too young but gives her a job as a stable hand due to her ability with horses, and she begins traveling with them. Doc's son, Al, wins a wild horse in a card game and Sonora names him Lightning. She later surprises Doc by taming and riding him, so he promises to train her to be a diving girl if she can mount it while it's moving, which she succeeds after multiple attempts.

Marie's regular horse gets sick, therefore Al decides to use Lightning in the shows. Sonora warns Marie not to kick him, but she ignores her and he causes her to fall off and dislocate her shoulder. With her unable to perform, Al asks Sonora if she can do the stunts. Although she has never dove with Lightning, their first jump is successful. Marie becomes jealous, and as Doc tires of her diva-like behavior, she quits rather than share billing with Sonora. Al develops a romance with her that strains his relationship with Doc, and he leaves home after a particularly bad fight. He promises to write to Sonora, but Doc hides all his letters and she thinks that he has forgotten about her. When Doc and the new stable hand, Clifford, are away from the farm in search of jobs for the show, Lightning falls ill with colic. Al returns, and he and Sonora work together to heal Lightning. Doc hasn't found any places for them to perform at, but then Al announces he has arranged a six-month contract to do so at the Steel Pier in Atlantic City, New Jersey. This reconciles Doc and Al, but then the former passes away of a heart attack on the way to Atlantic City, and Al assumes Doc's role as the show presenter. Sonora searches for Doc's jacket to give Al confidence on his first show, and finds one of his letters in it that confesses his love for her, and she lets him know that she feels the same.

Al proposes to Sonora just before a performance in front of their biggest crowd, which she accepts. The horse is a jittery stallion instead of Lightning, and he falters and trips off the end of the diving board after shying from cymbals crashing below. Not expecting it, Sonora has her eyes open as they land in the pool. Both are alive, but Sonora can't see properly. However, she hides this from Al, not wanting him to stop her from doing the shows. She wakes the next morning to discover she is permanently blind from detached retinas in both eyes. She has to learn to find her way around, and Al is always by her side to help her. To avoid a breach of contract lawsuit, he must find another diving girl within a week, so he calls Marie, who returns. Meanwhile, Sonora misses diving terribly, especially as she has to stay home while she knows Al and Marie are out performing. She tells Al of her desire to dive with Lightning again, and they work together to try to train her to mount him blind, but it proves fruitless and Al gives up.

The next day, Clifford locks Marie in her dressing room, and Sonora performs in her place with Lightning. Al shouts at her to come back down, but she continues and the jump is successful. Her voiceover tells you that she continued diving for eleven more years with the audience never learning of her blindness, and of her happy marriage to Al.

Cast

Gabrielle Anwar as Sonora Webster
Michael Schoeffling as Al Carver
Cliff Robertson as Doc Carver
Dylan Kussman as Clifford
Kathleen York as Marie
Frank Renzulli as Mr. Slater
Nancy Moore Atchison as Arnette Webster
Lisa Norman as Aunt Helen
Lorianne Collins as Clarabelle
Elizabeth Hayes as Miss Simpson
Laura Lee Norton as Mrs. Ellis
Michael J. Matusiak as Photographer
Jeff Woodward as Reporter #1
David Massry as Reporter #2
Cheri Brown as Attractive Girl
David Dwyer as Stagehand
Haley Aull as Little Girl
Ed Grady as Preacher
Katy Matson as Kid #1
Wendy Ball as Kid #2
Sam Aull as Kid #3
Carson Aull as Kid #4
Boyd Peterson as Farmer #1
Gene Walker as Farmer #2
Lowell D. Smith as Wrangler
Rick Warner as Doctor
Mark Jeffrey Miller as Candy Man
Tim Carter as Cymbal Player
Emily Maher as Extra #1

Reception
Upon the film's release, Sonora Webster Carver and her sister, Arnette French, watched it together. Sonora was dissatisfied with its embellishments and felt that it bore little resemblance to her life. She told Arnette that, "the only thing true in it was that I rode diving horses, I went blind, and I continued to ride for another 11 years." Arnette said that the movie "made a big deal about having the courage to go on riding after she lost her sight. But the truth was that riding the horse was the most fun you could have and we just loved it so."

The film holds a 73% rating on Rotten Tomatoes from 11 reviews.

References

External links
 
 
 
 Wild Hearts Can't Be Broken DVD Review at Ultimate Disney

1991 films
1990s children's films
1990s English-language films
1991 romantic drama films
American children's drama films
American films based on actual events
American romantic drama films
Biographical films about entertainers
Films about blind people
Films about horses
Films about orphans
Films based on memoirs
Films directed by Steve Miner
Films scored by Mason Daring
Films set in the 1930s
Films set in Atlantic City, New Jersey
Walt Disney Pictures films
1990s American films
Films about disability